Wellwater Conspiracy is the fourth and final studio album by the American rock band Wellwater Conspiracy. It was released on September 9, 2003, through Megaforce Records.

Overview
The album was recorded in 2002 at Space Studio in Seattle, Washington. The band members produced the album themselves. The album was mixed by Adam Kasper. The album includes a cover of the Thunderclap Newman song "Something in the Air". David Fricke of Rolling Stone said Wellwater Conspiracy "upgrade the fragrant eccentricity of vintage U.K. flower power—spaced riffing, spiked-afternoon-tea lyrics—with modern muscle." The band performed the song "Wimple Witch" from this album on the Late Show with David Letterman in 2003.

Track listing

Personnel

Wellwater Conspiracy
Matt Cameron – drums, vocals, guitars
John McBain – guitar, bass guitar, keyboards

Additional musicians and production
Gerry Amandes – quasi-horns on "Galaxy 265"
Chelsea Chiodo – artwork
Jack Endino, Kevin Suggs – mixing assistance
Joe Greenwald – artwork, assistance
Chris Hanzsek – mastering
Adam Kasper – mixing
Gregg Keplinger – bongos on "My Darker Bongo"
Ted Liljestrand – design
Sara Roberts – photography
Glenn Slater – keyboards
Wellwater Conspiracy – production
Carolyn White – computer editing

References

External links
Wellwater Conspiracy information at nowinvisibly.com

2003 albums
Wellwater Conspiracy albums
Albums produced by Matt Cameron